Wald railway station is a railway station in the Swiss canton of Zürich, situated in the municipality of Wald. The station is located on the Tösstalbahn between Winterthur and Rapperswil, and is served by Zürich S-Bahn line S26.

The station is also served by several bus routes of the Verkehrsbetriebe Zürichsee und Oberland (VZO), and of the Swiss PostBus service (PostAuto).

References

External links 

Wald station on Swiss Federal Railway's web site

Railway stations in the canton of Zürich
Swiss Federal Railways stations